The Norwegian Korea Medal was a campaign medal awarded by the Norwegian government for at least two months of service at the Norwegian Mobile Army Surgical Hospital during the Korean War. The medal was instituted on 29 April 1955.

The medal is 25th in the order of precedence, below The King's Medal of Merit for Service in the Home Guard, and above the Maudheim medal.

See also 

 Orders, decorations, and medals of Norway
 Norwegian Mobile Army Surgical Hospital (NORMASH)

References 

Orders, decorations, and medals of Norway
1955 establishments in Norway
Awards established in 1955
Military awards and decorations of the Korean War